Water polo events were contested at the 1961 Summer Universiade in Sofia, Bulgaria.

References
 Universiade water polo medalists on HickokSports

1961 Summer Universiade
Universiade
1961
1961